Spooks was an American hip-hop group, active from the mid-1990s to the mid-2000s. The members of the group got together in 1994, taking their name from the 1969 novel by Sam Greenlee, The Spook Who Sat by the Door.

Career
After attaining success throughout Europe with their album S.I.O.S.O.S., Vol. 1, Spooks garnered a hit with the single, "Things I've Seen", which featured in the Laurence Fishburne film Once in the Life (2000) as well as the intro for the European version of the American TV series Dark Angel.  Shortly afterwards, Spooks followed up with the number 16 on the top 40 charts hit "Karma Hotel." Spooks had sold several million records internationally and was eligible for a European platinum plaque. They also reached gold status in five countries. Back home in America, "Things I`ve Seen" hit number 11 on the hip hop singles charts and "Sweet Revenge" hit number 6 on the r&b singles charts. Water-Water left the group before their second album Faster Than You Know, and died in a car accident in September 2003, days before the album's release. The group never actually disbanded. Hypno, Ming Xia and Mr. Booka T formed Tongue Productions in 2002 and  produced tracks and wrote choruses that were placed with other acts  under the supervision of Riggs Morales at Shady Records. In 2007 the Spooks drifted apart to tackle new ventures but never officially called it quits. In 2009 Ming Xia appeared on Chali 2na's Fish Outta Water as well as AZ`s single "Super Star", all of which choruses and Bridges were written by Tongue Productions. In 2022, Mr. Booka T had changed his name to TUCK 88 and dropped the new single "Beautiful Ghetto" featuring Hypno as Mr. Chenjerai. Fun Fact: Beautiful Ghetto was actually written for a film soundtrack and later slated to be on the Spooks third album; which amount to about thirty unreleased tracks. TUCK 88 also released a track by his daughter N`Dea titled, "No Daisies". N`Dea had studied under the tutelage of Ming Xia and had first appeared on the Spooks song "Dead Beat" when she was only three years old. Spooks were discovered by Philadelphia hip-hop legend "Parry P", who signed them to the Antra Records, where he was the Vice President of A&R.

Discography

Albums

Singles

References

External links
[ The Spooks] on Allmusic
The Spooks on imusic.am
Spooks Biography
http://www.last.fm/music/Spooks
Ming-Xia's solo recordings
Interview with Joe Davis and Booker T  on drownedinsound.com

Musical groups from Philadelphia
American dance musicians
East Coast hip hop groups
Hip hop collectives
Rappers from Philadelphia